is a dam in Nagano Prefecture, Japan, completed in 1954.

References 

Dams in Nagano Prefecture
Dams completed in 1954